Redimi2 (born Willy González Cruz; June 3, 1979) is a Dominican Christian music rapper and songwriter.

González began releasing music in 1999 as a part of Redimi2 Squad, alongside his brother JG. After all members besides González left the group, González took the name Redimi2. He is considered to be one of the most popular Christian rappers of the Dominican Republic and is internationally known. He is also known as the first rapper to release an album of Christian rap in his country. Redimi2 has collaborated with Christian singers like Lucía Parker, Annette Moreno, Danny Berrios and Jesús Adrián Romero, and Puerto Rican rapper Vico C, Funky, Alex Zurdo and Manny Montes. Willy has been married to Daliza Contreras since 2005 and has a daughter named Samantha González.

He has been nominated in the Contemporary Religious Music category at the Casandra Awards (now the Soberano Awards), Dove Awards for Spanish Album and Spanish Language Recorded Song, and has twice won the Best Urban Album category at the Arpa Awards.

In 2021, Willy appeared on the Evan Craft song "Be Alright", alongside Danny Gokey. The song reached number 2 on Billboard's Hot Christian Songs chart.

Discography

Studio albums
Combinación Mortal (2000)
Hasta Los Dientes (2004)
Revolución (2006)
Phenomenon Edition (2009)
Exterminador Operación P.R. (2011)
Exterminador Operación P.R. 100X35 (2012)
Exterminador Operación R.D. (2012)
Exterminador Operación Mundial (2014) 
Pura Sal (2017)
Trapstornadores (2018) 
20/20 (2020)
Momentum (2021)
Rompiendo (2022)

Live / special edition albums
 Vivo: El Concierto (2008)

Other discs
 El equipo invencible (2007)
 Mas (with Funky) (2013)
 UNO (with Alex Zurdo and Funky) (2021)

Mixtape
 Rap Redimi2: Las cosas que nunca dije (The Mixtape Vol.1) (2010)

Singles
 "Combinación Mortal"
 "Raphy Méndez"
 "Raphy Méndez parte 2"
 "Raphy Méndez parte 3"
 "5 Micrófonos" (featuring Ariel Kelly and 3C)
 "¿Qué Me Viste?"
 "Déjame Nacer"
 "Omar y Erika" (featuring Isabelle)
 "Yo No Canto Basura"
 "Voy Delante"
 "Qué Futuro Tendrá"
 "Buenas Noticias"
 "Ruge 2.0"
 "Estoy Aquí" (featuring Lucía Parker)
 "7 En El Micrófono" (featuring Manny Montes, Goyo, Alex Zurdo, Michael Pratts, Sugar, Maso)
 "Pao Pao Pao" (featuring Vico C)
 "Ella No Cree En El Amor"
 "Es Con Dios"
 "No Woman Don't Cry"
 "Dominicano Soy"
 "Yo Soy Así" (featuring Funky)
 "Yo Sere Tu Sol" (featuring Tercer Cielo)
 "Fenomenal"
 "Nunca Me Avergonzaré" (featuring Daniela Barroso)
 "Saldrás De Esta" (featuring René González, Lucía Parker)
 "El Nombre de Jesús" (featuring Christine D'Clario)
 "Aleluya Amén"
 "Espíritu Santo" (featuring Barak)
 "Ofensivo Y Escandaloso"
 "Tus Pasos" (featuring Ulises de Rescate)
 "Viviré" (featuring Evan Craft)
 "Pura Sal" (featuring Funky, Alex Zurdo)
 "Milagro De Amor" (featuring Joel De Jesus)
 "Un Millón De Razones"
 "Filipenses 1:6"(featuring Almighty)
"Por Un Like" (featuring Lizzy Parra, Angel Brown)
"Trapstorno" (featuring Rubinsky RBK, Natan El Profeta, Philippe)

References

External links
 

1979 births
Living people
Dominican Republic rappers